Cruger, or Crüger, is a surname of German origin. Notable people with the surname include:

 Carl Friedrich August Alexander Crüger (1813-1885), German entomologist
 Daniel Cruger (1780-1843), American lawyer
 Henry Cruger (1739–1827), American and British politician
 Herbert Crüger (1911-2003), German politician
 Hermann Crüger (1818-1864), German pharmacist
 Johann Crüger (1598–1662), German composer
 John Cruger (1678–1744), mayor of New York City, 1739–1744
 John Cruger Jr. (1710–1791), mayor of New York, 1757–1766
 Julia Cruger (1850-1920), American novelist
 Mary Cruger (1834-1908), American novelist
 Peter Crüger (1580–1639), mathematician, astronomer and polymath

German-language surnames
Germanic-language surnames
Surnames of German origin